Alnus japonica, known as Japanese alder, is a species of Alnus from Japan, Korea, Taiwan, eastern China, and Russia.

References

External links
 
 

japonica
Plants described in 1799
Trees of Korea